Saw U may mean:

Musical instruments
 Saw u, Thai musical instrument

Name of Burmese royals
 Saw U of Myinsaing, Chief queen consort of Myinsaing
 Mi Saw U, Chief queen consort of Pinya
 Saw U of Mrauk-U, Queen of the Northern Palace of Mrauk-U